Llwyngwril railway station serves the village of Llwyngwril in Gwynedd, Wales. The station is an unstaffed halt on the Cambrian Coast Railway with passenger services to Barmouth, Harlech, Porthmadog, Pwllheli, Tywyn, Aberdovey, Machynlleth and Shrewsbury. Trains stop on request.

The former station building is now a private dwelling. Llwyngwril was once a two platformed station with a passing loop and a water crane. Between Llwyngwril station and Fairbourne station is Friog cliff, which has views out to sea.

In 2016, The Welsh Government funded the installation of reinforced glass fibre 'humps' on the platforms to improve access for wheelchair and pushchair users onto and off trains.

References

External links

Railway stations in Gwynedd
DfT Category F2 stations
Former Cambrian Railway stations
Railway stations in Great Britain opened in 1863
Railway stations served by Transport for Wales Rail
Railway request stops in Great Britain
Llangelynin, Gwynedd